The Westminster St George's by-election of 1921 was held on 7 June 1921.  The by-election was held due to the elevation to the peerage of the incumbent Coalition Conservative MP, Walter Long.  It was won by the Anti-Waste League candidate James Malcolm Monteith Erskine.

References

Westminster St George's by-election
Politics of the City of Westminster
Westminster St George's by-election
Westminster St George's by-election
Westminster St George's,1921